Astapa is a genus of moths of the family Notodontidae.

Species
Astapa drewi Miller, 2011
Astapa signata Dognin, 1911

References

Notodontidae
Moth genera